The Pont Alexandre III is a deck arch bridge that spans the Seine in Paris. It connects the Champs-Élysées quarter with those of the Invalides and Eiffel Tower. The bridge is widely regarded as the most ornate, extravagant bridge in the city. It has been classified as a French monument historique since 1975.

History
The Beaux-Arts style bridge, with its exuberant Art Nouveau lamps, cherubs, nymphs and winged horses at either end, was built between 1896 and 1900. It is named after Tsar Alexander III, who had concluded the Franco-Russian Alliance in 1892. His son Nicholas II laid the foundation stone in October 1896. The style of the bridge reflects that of the Grand Palais, to which it leads on the right bank.

The design, by the architects  and Gaston Cousin, was constrained by the need to keep the bridge from obscuring the view of the Champs-Élysées or the Invalides.

It was inaugurated in 1900 for the Exposition Universelle (universal exhibition) World's Fair, as were the nearby Grand Palais and Petit Palais.

Sculptures

Numerous sculptors provided the sculptures that feature prominently on the bridge.

Fames
Four gilt-bronze statues of Fames watch over the bridge, supported on massive  masonry socles, that provide stabilizing counterweight for the arch, without interfering with monumental views. The socles are crowned by Fames restraining Pegasus.

On the Right Bank: Renommée des Sciences ("Fame of the Sciences") and the Renommée des Arts ("Fame of the Arts"), both by Emmanuel Frémiet. The lions groups are by Georges Gardet.
At their bases, France de la Renaissance ("France of the Renaissance") by Jules Coutan and La France de Louis XIV ("France of Louis XIV") by Laurent Marqueste. The lions groups are by Jules Dalou.

Nymphs

The nymph reliefs are at the centres of the arches over the Seine, memorials to the Franco-Russian Alliance. The Nymphs of the Seine has a relief of the arms of Paris, and faces the Nymphs of the Neva with the arms of Imperial Russia. They are both executed in hammered copper over forms by Georges Récipon.

In the same political spirit, the Trinity Bridge in Saint Petersburg was conceived as a memorial to the Franco-Russian Alliance. It was designed by Gustave Eiffel, and the first stone was laid in August 1897 by French president Félix Faure.

Cultural associations

 Films and videos
 In the 1956 film Anastasia.
 The Moody Blues' first music video footage for the song “Nights in White Satin” was shot two times with two scenes throughout the middle and the ending of the song in 1967.
 In the 1979 film French Postcards, the final romantic scene takes place on the bridge.
 In the 1985 James Bond film A View to a Kill, Bond comes to a halt at the bridge in a hijacked taxi. Moments later, Bond jumps from the bridge onto a boat. 
 In the 1997 animated film Anastasia, the bridge is damaged by Rasputin in an attempt to kill Anastasia, who in real life was the granddaughter of Alexander III of Russia. Ironically, his downfall and ultimate death take place on the same bridge.
 In the 1998 film Ronin, the spy team meets some arms dealers under the bridge on the Right Bank.
 In the 2004 film A Very Long Engagement, Marion Cotillard's character kills the character played by François Levantal under the bridge.
 In the 2005 film Angel-A it is the Pont Alexandre III from which Angela and André jump into the Seine.
In the 2006 music video for Mariah Carey's hit single "Say Somethin'" with Pharrell and Snoop Dogg.
 In the 2006 episode "Cold Stones" of The Sopranos, Carmela Soprano and her friend Rosalie Aprile walk in wonderment over the bridge. 
 In the 2011 film Midnight in Paris, the bridge is depicted in multiple scenes, including the final one.
 Adele's music video for the song "Someone Like You" was shot on the bridge in 2011.
 In the 2016 film Me Before You, the closing shot was filmed near the northeast corner of the bridge.
 In the 2016 Bollywood film Befikre, the song "Nashe si Chadh Gayi" was shot on the river bank by the bridge.
 The 2018 film Fantastic Beasts: The Crimes of Grindelwald features a sequence with the main character, Newt Scamander, capturing an escaped magical creature known as a Zouwu on the bridge.
 In the 2020 Netflix Original TV series Emily in Paris, Savoir, the French marketing firm where Emily works, films a perfume advertisement here with their client, Maison Lavaux.
 Jung Jaehyun (NCT) was shooting a music video for his cover version of the 2017 song "I Like Me Better" by Lauv.

Musicals
 In the 2017 Broadway musical Anastasia, based on the 1997 film, the bridge is seen in the second half of the musical and in the closing scene. Anastasia was the granddaughter of Alexander III, who is mentioned in the musical.

Sports
In June 2017, with Paris competing against Los Angeles to host the 2024 Olympics, Paris turned some of its world-famous landmarks over to sports and installed diving boards on the Alexandre III bridge that spanned the Seine.

Gallery

See also
 List of bridges in France

References

External links

 
 Pont Alexandre III
 Alexandre III Bridge, current photographs and of the 1900s.

Alexandre III
Buildings and structures in the 8th arrondissement of Paris
Alexandre
Alexandre
Exposition Universelle (1900)
Monuments historiques of Paris
Art Nouveau architecture in Paris
Beaux-Arts architecture in France
Historicist architecture in France
World's fair architecture in Paris
Alexandre
Buildings and structures in the 7th arrondissement of Paris
1900 establishments in France